In United States law, a gross misdemeanor is a crime which is more serious than a regular misdemeanor, but is still classified as a minor crime, as opposed to serious crimes. Such crimes may include petty theft, simple assault or driving under the influence of alcohol and/or other drugs. Typically, the maximum sentence is one year in county jail and/or $5,000 in fines.

See also
Misdemeanor

References 

U.S. state criminal law